Ferry near Gorinchem is a mid 17th century painting by Dutch artist Salomon van Ruysdael. Done in oil on canvas, the work depicts a riverside embankment near Gorinchem in the Netherlands; in addition, the painting also depicts the prominent St Jan's Tower of the Grote Kerk, the town's church. Ruysdael's rendering of the land near Gorinchem was possibly impacted due to the artist's owning of a mill on the river. The work is in the collection of the Metropolitan Museum of Art.

References

See also 
River Landscape with Ferry
Paintings in the collection of the Metropolitan Museum of Art
Paintings by Salomon van Ruysdael